Lemniscate is the debut album from Los Angeles-based experimental pop band, Vinyl Williams, led by Lionel Williams.

Lemniscate was released through No Pain In Pop (EU) and Williams' own Salonislam imprint (US) on November 12, 2012. Available formats included 12" vinyl album, CD and download. Lemniscate features a mix of genres including electronic, krautrock, psychedelia, rock, shoegaze, pop and chillwave.

Critical reception

The Guardian's New Music critic, Michael Cragg, reviewed the album's track Open Your Mind in October 2012, while "Lemniscate" as a whole was featured as Rough Trade's "Album Of The Week" shortly after its release. Other media outlets reviewing the album included This is fake DIY and James Skinner from BBC Music.

Artwork

The album artwork is an original photo taken by Jay Bender.

Track listing

All songs created and performed solely by songwriter, vocalist, instrumentalist and producer Williams.

References

2012 albums